Sphenomorphus bignelli  is a species of skink, a lizard in the family Scincidae. The species is endemic to the Solomon Islands.

Etymology
The specific name, bignelli, is in honor of Charles Robert Bignell (1892–1964), who was a planter in the Solomon Islands.

Habitat

Description
S. bignelli is a small species for its genus. S. bignelli is dark reddish brown dorsally, and it is pale yellow ventrally.

Behavior
S. bignelli is diurnal and terrestrial. It is not fossorial, but does hide in leaf litter and under fallen logs.

Diet
S. bignelli preys upon insects and their larvae.

Reproduction
The mode of reproduction of S. bignelli is unknown.

References

Further reading
McCoy M (2015). A Field Guide to the Reptiles of the Solomon Islands (pdf). Kuranda, Queensland, Australia: Michael McCoy. 137 pp.
Schmidt KP (1932). "Reptiles and Amphibians from the Solomon Islands". Field Museum of Natural History, Zoological Series 18 (9): 175–190. (Sphenomorphus bignelli, new species, pp. 183–184).

bignelli
Reptiles described in 1932
Taxa named by Karl Patterson Schmidt
Reptiles of the Solomon Islands